Livery Antonovich Sakchetti (1815–1916) was an Italian-Russian music historian, theoretician, and music critic of the 19th century. He was the first professor in music history and aesthetics at the Saint Petersburg Conservatory, and was a member of the Bologna Philharmonic Academy.  His 1883 essay entitled "Essay on the General History of Music" is considered to be the earliest systematic study on the history of Russian music in the country, and his detailed studies of music theory, music pedagogy, and musical aesthetics are still used in conservatories and academies today.

Family 
Sakchetti was born in 1852 in the town of Ust-Kenzar located in Tambov Oblast, Russia. He was born into a prominent family of Italian musicians, and is confirmed to have had one son, Alexander Sacchetti.[rus]

Education 
Livery was a graduate of the Saint Petersburg Conservatory, where he studied under the cello faculty, including Jewish cellist and composer Karl Davydov, and also studied music theory under both Yu. I. Johansen and Nikolai Rimsky-Korsakov. He went on to become a professor in music history and aesthetics at the Conservatory.

Career 
In 1886, he began teaching his first classes; for the first time in Russian conservatory practice, he began teaching classes dedicated to discussing the aesthetics and historical significance of composers both domestic and European in origination.

Works 

 1891: "An Essay on the General History of Music" (2nd ed.)
 1892: "Collection of exemplary works of former times" (addition in Russian music magazine "Muse")
 1894: "On the musical artistry of the ancient Greeks"
 1896: "Brief historical musical reader from ancient times to the 17th century" (St. Petersburg)
 1896: "From the field of aesthetics and music" (St. Petersburg)

Undated 

 "Overview of the main foundations of aesthetics" (Included in "Bulletin of Fine Arts")

See also 

 List of Russian composers
 Music of Russia

Further sources 

 Саккетти Л. А: (Университетская библиотека ONLINE: Л. Ю., Силенок)

References

Music criticism
People from Rasskazovsky District

Saint Petersburg Conservatory alumni
Russian musicologists